Vue Pa Chay's revolt, also called War of the Insane or the Madman's War (Guerre du Fou) by French sources, was a Hmong revolt against taxation in the French colonial administration in Indochina lasting from 1918 to 1921. Vue Pa Chay, the leader of the revolt, regularly climbed trees to receive military orders from heaven. The French granted the Hmong a special status in 1920, effectively ending the conflict.

The stimulus for the rebellion was heavy taxation by the French and abuse of power by the ethnic Lao and Tai tax collectors. The Hmong people were divided into pro-French and anti-French factions.

The rebellion, called "Rog Paj Cai" by the Hmong nationalists and "Rog Phim Npab" by Hmong who sided with the French, was a self-initiated and self-sustaining movement. All guns were Hmong-designed and manufactured flintlocks, which were slightly different from the traditional western flintlock gun. The gunpowder was also of a Hmong type (salt peter, charcoal and guano was used similarly to western black powder, but shavings from a specific type of tree were added to increase the explosivity). The Hmong won battle after battle for most of the rebellion. The French were surprised and did not know how to fight in the jungles or how to fight the guerrilla warfare by the nearly invisible army. France was also heavily involved in World War I in Europe and resorted to using 50% French and 50% native Vietnamese, Lao, and Tai and Hmong soldiers, who had little desire to fight the rebel Hmong forces.

One particular weapon feared by the French was the Hmong cannon, which was made with the trunk of a tree and packed with metal pieces from pots and a large quantity of Hmong gunpowder. The cannon was designed by Kuab Chav and is said to have weighed over 200 lbs and so only one man, named Lwv, was able to carry it. As the French soldiers came up the mountainous trails, the cannon would launch metal shards at them. The French assumed that the Hmong did not have the technology to build such a weapon and so never discovered it.

The French morale was also weakened because of rumors that Pa Chay's army was protected by magic. As the French Army chased the Hmong Army through the mountainous passes and ravines they did not see any dead Hmong soldiers. The reason for this was that Pa Chay had ordered his men not to leave anyone behind and to cover up the blood as quickly as possible.  That gave the illusion to the French that Pa Chay's army was indeed invincible.

Kao Mee, a sister of Pa Chay, also played an important role.  She carried a white flag made of hemp, which she used to deflect bullets. She was said to have been a righteous virgin and so the Heavens allowed her to have such miraculous powers. She led the army to many successful battles.

At its height, the rebellion encompassed 40,000 square kilometers of Indochina, from Điện Biên Phủ in Tonkin to Nam Ou in Luang Prabang, and from Muong Cha north of Vientiane to Sam Neua in Laos.  As World War I came to an end, the French reinforcements began to outnumber the rebels, and their firepower overpowered the Hmong.  They also learned from certain Hmong informants such as Lauj Kiab Toom that the Hmong gunpowder did not work well when it was wet and so they attacked especially during the monsoon season. The Hmong believed their defeats to be temporary and caused by violations of the Oath to Heaven by some of the soldiers. Despite their defeats, they still had strong popular support.

Further reading

See also 
Holy Man's Rebellion

References

20th-century revolutions
Rebellions in Asia
Rebellions in Vietnam
Wars involving Vietnam
History of Hmong people 
1918 in Vietnam
1919 in Vietnam
1920 in Vietnam
1921 in Vietnam
20th century in Vietnam
20th century in Laos
Wars involving France
Conflicts in 1918
Conflicts in 1919
Conflicts in 1920
Conflicts in 1921
Violence against indigenous peoples